Kinects is a residential skyscraper in the Denny Triangle neighborhood of Seattle, Washington. The , 40-story tower has 357 apartments and a  restaurant at its base. It was completed in July 2017, after two years of construction. The building is located along Minor Avenue between Stewart and Howell streets, on the same block as the under construction AMLI Arc and Tilt 49 complex.

It features a rooftop swimming pool and other amenities, including a  hemlock tree.

The tower was originally approved for construction in 2008 and was to break ground the following year, but was put on hold during the Great Recession. Developer Security Properties revived the project in 2014 and began construction in February 2015. It was completed in July 2017.

References

Denny Triangle, Seattle
Residential skyscrapers in Seattle
Residential buildings completed in 2017
2017 establishments in Washington (state)